Gary Edwards (born October 5, 1947) is a Canadian former professional ice hockey goaltender who played in the National Hockey League (NHL) from 1968 to 1982. He was selected by the St. Louis Blues in the 1968 NHL Amateur Draft and played for six teams during his career.

Playing career
Born in Toronto, Ontario, Edwards was drafted by the St. Louis Blues in the first round (6th overall) in the 1968 NHL Amateur Draft. Besides the Blues (1968–69 to 1969–70 and 1981–82), Edwards played for the Los Angeles Kings (1971–72 to 1976–77), Cleveland Barons/Minnesota North Stars (1976–77 to 1979–80), Edmonton Oilers (1980–81), and Pittsburgh Penguins (1981–82). From 1972 to 1976, he teamed with Rogatien Vachon to give the Los Angeles Kings one of the best goaltender tandems in the NHL. Edwards' best season was 1974-75 when he posted a 2.34 goals against average in 27 games while backing up Vachon. They were a close runner up for the 1975 Vezina Trophy, losing out to Bernie Parent of the Stanley Cup champion Philadelphia Flyers by a mere 4 goals.

Career statistics

Regular season and playoffs

External links
 

1947 births
Living people
Canadian ice hockey goaltenders
Cleveland Barons (NHL) players
Edmonton Oilers players
Kansas City Blues players
Los Angeles Kings players
Minnesota North Stars players
National Hockey League first-round draft picks
Pittsburgh Penguins players
St. Louis Blues draft picks
St. Louis Blues players
San Diego Gulls (WHL) players
Ice hockey people from Toronto
Toronto Marlboros players